The 1961–62 Toronto Maple Leafs season saw the Leafs finish in second place in the National Hockey League (NHL) with a record of 37 wins, 22 losses, and 11 ties for 85 points. They ousted the New York Rangers in six games in the Semi-finals before defeating the defending champion Chicago Black Hawks, also in six games, to win their first Stanley Cup championship since 1951. It would be the first of three straight Stanley Cup titles for the team, and four overall during the decade of the 1960s.

Offseason

Regular season

Season standings

Schedule and results

|- align="center" bgcolor="#CCFFCC"
|1||W||October 12, 1961||4–2 || align="left"| @ Detroit Red Wings (1961–62) ||1–0–0||2|| || || || || W1
|- align="center" bgcolor="#CCFFCC"
|2||W||October 14, 1961||3–2 || align="left"|  Boston Bruins (1961–62) ||2–0–0||4|| || || || || W2
|- align="center" bgcolor="#FFBBBB"
|3||L||October 15, 1961||1–2 || align="left"| @ New York Rangers (1961–62) ||2–1–0||4|| || || || || L1
|- align="center"
|4||T||October 21, 1961||1–1 || align="left"|  Chicago Black Hawks (1961–62) ||2–1–1||5|| || || || || T1
|- align="center" bgcolor="#CCFFCC"
|5||W||October 22, 1961||9–1 || align="left"| @ Boston Bruins (1961–62) ||3–1–1||7|| || || || || W1
|- align="center" bgcolor="#CCFFCC"
|6||W||October 28, 1961||5–1 || align="left"|  New York Rangers (1961–62) ||4–1–1||9|| || || || || W2
|- align="center" bgcolor="#FFBBBB"
|7||L||October 29, 1961||2–4 || align="left"| @ New York Rangers (1961–62) ||4–2–1||9|| || || || || L1
|-

|- align="center" bgcolor="#CCFFCC"
|8||W||November 1, 1961||3–2 || align="left"|  Montreal Canadiens (1961–62) ||5–2–1||11|| || || || || W1
|- align="center" bgcolor="#CCFFCC"
|9||W||November 4, 1961||2–1 || align="left"|  Chicago Black Hawks (1961–62) ||6–2–1||13|| || || || || W2
|- align="center" bgcolor="#CCFFCC"
|10||W||November 5, 1961||3–2 || align="left"| @ Detroit Red Wings (1961–62) ||7–2–1||15|| || || || || W3
|- align="center" bgcolor="#FFBBBB"
|11||L||November 7, 1961||0–6 || align="left"| @ Chicago Black Hawks (1961–62) ||7–3–1||15|| || || || || L1
|- align="center" bgcolor="#FFBBBB"
|12||L||November 9, 1961||2–5 || align="left"| @ Montreal Canadiens (1961–62) ||7–4–1||15|| || || || || L2
|- align="center" bgcolor="#CCFFCC"
|13||W||November 11, 1961||5–1 || align="left"|  Detroit Red Wings (1961–62) ||8–4–1||17|| || || || || W1
|- align="center" bgcolor="#FFBBBB"
|14||L||November 12, 1961||3–4 || align="left"| @ Boston Bruins (1961–62) ||8–5–1||17|| || || || || L1
|- align="center" bgcolor="#CCFFCC"
|15||W||November 15, 1961||3–2 || align="left"|  Montreal Canadiens (1961–62) ||9–5–1||19|| || || || || W1
|- align="center" bgcolor="#CCFFCC"
|16||W||November 18, 1961||6–1 || align="left"|  Detroit Red Wings (1961–62) ||10–5–1||21|| || || || || W2
|- align="center" bgcolor="#FFBBBB"
|17||L||November 19, 1961||3–5 || align="left"| @ New York Rangers (1961–62) ||10–6–1||21|| || || || || L1
|- align="center" bgcolor="#CCFFCC"
|18||W||November 23, 1961||5–2 || align="left"| @ Chicago Black Hawks (1961–62) ||11–6–1||23|| || || || || W1
|- align="center" bgcolor="#CCFFCC"
|19||W||November 25, 1961||6–0 || align="left"|  New York Rangers (1961–62) ||12–6–1||25|| || || || || W2
|- align="center" bgcolor="#CCFFCC"
|20||W||November 26, 1961||4–1 || align="left"| @ Boston Bruins (1961–62) ||13–6–1||27|| || || || || W3
|- align="center"
|21||T||November 29, 1961||2–2 || align="left"|  Montreal Canadiens (1961–62) ||13–6–2||28|| || || || || T1
|- align="center"
|22||T||November 30, 1961||1–1 || align="left"| @ Montreal Canadiens (1961–62) ||13–6–3||29|| || || || || T2
|-

|- align="center" bgcolor="#CCFFCC"
|23||W||December 2, 1961||6–4 || align="left"|  Chicago Black Hawks (1961–62) ||14–6–3||31|| || || || || W1
|- align="center" bgcolor="#FFBBBB"
|24||L||December 3, 1961||1–3 || align="left"| @ Detroit Red Wings (1961–62) ||14–7–3||31|| || || || || L1
|- align="center" bgcolor="#FFBBBB"
|25||L||December 7, 1961||1–4 || align="left"| @ Montreal Canadiens (1961–62) ||14–8–3||31|| || || || || L2
|- align="center" bgcolor="#CCFFCC"
|26||W||December 9, 1961||9–2 || align="left"|  Boston Bruins (1961–62) ||15–8–3||33|| || || || || W1
|- align="center" bgcolor="#CCFFCC"
|27||W||December 10, 1961||3–2 || align="left"| @ New York Rangers (1961–62) ||16–8–3||35|| || || || || W2
|- align="center" bgcolor="#CCFFCC"
|28||W||December 16, 1961||4–2 || align="left"|  New York Rangers (1961–62) ||17–8–3||37|| || || || || W3
|- align="center" bgcolor="#CCFFCC"
|29||W||December 17, 1961||4–1 || align="left"| @ Boston Bruins (1961–62) ||18–8–3||39|| || || || || W4
|- align="center" bgcolor="#FFBBBB"
|30||L||December 23, 1961||4–7 || align="left"|  Boston Bruins (1961–62) ||18–9–3||39|| || || || || L1
|- align="center"
|31||T||December 25, 1961||3–3 || align="left"| @ Chicago Black Hawks (1961–62) ||18–9–4||40|| || || || || T1
|- align="center"
|32||T||December 27, 1961||0–0 || align="left"|  Chicago Black Hawks (1961–62) ||18–9–5||41|| || || || || T2
|- align="center" bgcolor="#CCFFCC"
|33||W||December 30, 1961||6–4 || align="left"|  Detroit Red Wings (1961–62) ||19–9–5||43|| || || || || W1
|- align="center" bgcolor="#FFBBBB"
|34||L||December 31, 1961||2–4 || align="left"| @ Detroit Red Wings (1961–62) ||19–10–5||43|| || || || || L1
|-

|- align="center" bgcolor="#CCFFCC"
|35||W||January 3, 1962||3–1 || align="left"|  Montreal Canadiens (1961–62) ||20–10–5||45|| || || || || W1
|- align="center" bgcolor="#CCFFCC"
|36||W||January 6, 1962||6–3 || align="left"|  Chicago Black Hawks (1961–62) ||21–10–5||47|| || || || || W2
|- align="center" bgcolor="#CCFFCC"
|37||W||January 7, 1962||4–3 || align="left"| @ New York Rangers (1961–62) ||22–10–5||49|| || || || || W3
|- align="center" bgcolor="#CCFFCC"
|38||W||January 10, 1962||7–5 || align="left"|  Boston Bruins (1961–62) ||23–10–5||51|| || || || || W4
|- align="center" bgcolor="#FFBBBB"
|39||L||January 11, 1962||2–4 || align="left"| @ Montreal Canadiens (1961–62) ||23–11–5||51|| || || || || L1
|- align="center" bgcolor="#CCFFCC"
|40||W||January 13, 1962||4–3 || align="left"|  Detroit Red Wings (1961–62) ||24–11–5||53|| || || || || W1
|- align="center"
|41||T||January 14, 1962||2–2 || align="left"| @ Chicago Black Hawks (1961–62) ||24–11–6||54|| || || || || T1
|- align="center" bgcolor="#CCFFCC"
|42||W||January 17, 1962||4–2 || align="left"|  New York Rangers (1961–62) ||25–11–6||56|| || || || || W1
|- align="center" bgcolor="#FFBBBB"
|43||L||January 20, 1962||4–5 || align="left"|  Boston Bruins (1961–62) ||25–12–6||56|| || || || || L1
|- align="center" bgcolor="#CCFFCC"
|44||W||January 21, 1962||5–1 || align="left"| @ Boston Bruins (1961–62) ||26–12–6||58|| || || || || W1
|- align="center" bgcolor="#FFBBBB"
|45||L||January 24, 1962||1–2 || align="left"| @ Chicago Black Hawks (1961–62) ||26–13–6||58|| || || || || L1
|- align="center" bgcolor="#CCFFCC"
|46||W||January 27, 1962||4–2 || align="left"|  Detroit Red Wings (1961–62) ||27–13–6||60|| || || || || W1
|- align="center"
|47||T||January 28, 1962||2–2 || align="left"| @ Detroit Red Wings (1961–62) ||27–13–7||61|| || || || || T1
|-

|- align="center" bgcolor="#FFBBBB"
|48||L||February 1, 1962||2–5 || align="left"| @ Montreal Canadiens (1961–62) ||27–14–7||61|| || || || || L1
|- align="center" bgcolor="#CCFFCC"
|49||W||February 3, 1962||4–1 || align="left"|  New York Rangers (1961–62) ||28–14–7||63|| || || || || W1
|- align="center" bgcolor="#FFBBBB"
|50||L||February 4, 1962||1–2 || align="left"| @ Chicago Black Hawks (1961–62) ||28–15–7||63|| || || || || L1
|- align="center"
|51||T||February 7, 1962||2–2 || align="left"|  Boston Bruins (1961–62) ||28–15–8||64|| || || || || T1
|- align="center" bgcolor="#FFBBBB"
|52||L||February 10, 1962||2–4 || align="left"|  Montreal Canadiens (1961–62) ||28–16–8||64|| || || || || L1
|- align="center" bgcolor="#FFBBBB"
|53||L||February 11, 1962||0–5 || align="left"| @ Detroit Red Wings (1961–62) ||28–17–8||64|| || || || || L2
|- align="center" bgcolor="#CCFFCC"
|54||W||February 17, 1962||5–3 || align="left"|  New York Rangers (1961–62) ||29–17–8||66|| || || || || W1
|- align="center" bgcolor="#FFBBBB"
|55||L||February 18, 1962||2–6 || align="left"| @ New York Rangers (1961–62) ||29–18–8||66|| || || || || L1
|- align="center" bgcolor="#FFBBBB"
|56||L||February 21, 1962||2–4 || align="left"|  Montreal Canadiens (1961–62) ||29–19–8||66|| || || || || L2
|- align="center" bgcolor="#CCFFCC"
|57||W||February 24, 1962||7–2 || align="left"|  Boston Bruins (1961–62) ||30–19–8||68|| || || || || W1
|- align="center" bgcolor="#CCFFCC"
|58||W||February 25, 1962||8–2 || align="left"| @ Detroit Red Wings (1961–62) ||31–19–8||70|| || || || || W2
|- align="center" bgcolor="#CCFFCC"
|59||W||February 28, 1962||4–2 || align="left"|  Chicago Black Hawks (1961–62) ||32–19–8||72|| || || || || W3
|-

|- align="center" bgcolor="#CCFFCC"
|60||W||March 3, 1962||3–1 || align="left"|  New York Rangers (1961–62) ||33–19–8||74|| || || || || W4
|- align="center" bgcolor="#CCFFCC"
|61||W||March 4, 1962||5–1 || align="left"| @ Boston Bruins (1961–62) ||34–19–8||76|| || || || || W5
|- align="center"
|62||T||March 8, 1962||1–1 || align="left"| @ Montreal Canadiens (1961–62) ||34–19–9||77|| || || || || T1
|- align="center" bgcolor="#CCFFCC"
|63||W||March 10, 1962||2–0 || align="left"|  Detroit Red Wings (1961–62) ||35–19–9||79|| || || || || W1
|- align="center" bgcolor="#CCFFCC"
|64||W||March 11, 1962||3–2 || align="left"| @ Chicago Black Hawks (1961–62) ||36–19–9||81|| || || || || W2
|- align="center" bgcolor="#CCFFCC"
|65||W||March 14, 1962||5–2 || align="left"|  Montreal Canadiens (1961–62) ||37–19–9||83|| || || || || W3
|- align="center" bgcolor="#FFBBBB"
|66||L||March 17, 1962||1–3 || align="left"|  Chicago Black Hawks (1961–62) ||37–20–9||83|| || || || || L1
|- align="center"
|67||T||March 18, 1962||2–2 || align="left"| @ New York Rangers (1961–62) ||37–20–10||84|| || || || || T1
|- align="center" bgcolor="#FFBBBB"
|68||L||March 22, 1962||1–4 || align="left"| @ Montreal Canadiens (1961–62) ||37–21–10||84|| || || || || L1
|- align="center"
|69||T||March 24, 1962||2–2 || align="left"|  Detroit Red Wings (1961–62) ||37–21–11||85|| || || || || T1
|- align="center" bgcolor="#FFBBBB"
|70||L||March 25, 1962||4–5 || align="left"| @ Boston Bruins (1961–62) ||37–22–11||85|| || || || || L1
|-

All times EASTERN

Playoffs
The Toronto Maple Leafs won the Stanley Cup for the 10th time in franchise history and the first Stanley Cup since 1951 after defeating the New York Rangers 4–2 in the Stanley Cup Semifinals and the Chicago Black Hawks 4–2 in the Stanley Cup Finals.

|- align="center" bgcolor="#CCFFCC"
|1||W||March 27, 1962||4–2 || || align="left"|  New York Rangers (1961–62) || 1–0 || || || || W1
|- align="center" bgcolor="#CCFFCC"
|2||W||March 29, 1962||2–1 || || align="left"|  New York Rangers (1961–62) || 2–0 || || || || W2
|- align="center" bgcolor="#FFBBBB"
|3||L||April 1, 1962||4–5 || || align="left"| @ New York Rangers (1961–62) || 2–1 || || || || L1
|- align="center" bgcolor="#FFBBBB"
|4||L||April 3, 1962||2–4 || || align="left"| @ New York Rangers (1961–62) || 2–2 || || || || L2
|- align="center" bgcolor="#CCFFCC"
|5||W||April 5, 1962||3–2 || 2OT || align="left"|  New York Rangers (1961–62) || 3–2 || || || || W1
|- align="center" bgcolor="#CCFFCC"
|6||W||April 7, 1962||7–1 || || align="left"|  New York Rangers (1961–62) || 4–2 || || || || W2
|-

|- align="center" bgcolor="#CCFFCC"
|1||W||April 10, 1962||4–1 || || align="left"|  Chicago Black Hawks (1961–62) ||1–0 || || || || W1
|- align="center" bgcolor="#CCFFCC"
|2||W||April 12, 1962||3–2 || || align="left"|  Chicago Black Hawks (1961–62) ||2–0 || || || || W2
|- align="center" bgcolor="#FFBBBB"
|3||L||April 15, 1962||0–3 || || align="left"| @ Chicago Black Hawks (1961–62) ||2–1 || || || || L1
|- align="center" bgcolor="#FFBBBB"
|4||L||April 17, 1962||1–4 || || align="left"| @ Chicago Black Hawks (1961–62) ||2–2 || || || || L2
|- align="center" bgcolor="#CCFFCC"
|5||W||April 19, 1962||8–4 || || align="left"|  Chicago Black Hawks (1961–62) ||3–2 || || || || W1
|- align="center" bgcolor="#CCFFCC"
|6||W||April 22, 1962||2–1 || || align="left"| @ Chicago Black Hawks (1961–62) ||4–2 || || || || W2
|-

All times EASTERN

Player statistics

Forwards
Note: GP= Games played; G= Goals; AST= Assists; PTS = Points; PIM = Points

Defencemen
Note: GP= Games played; G= Goals; AST= Assists; PTS = Points; PIM = Points

Goaltending
Note: GP= Games played; W= Wins; L= Losses; T = Ties; SO = Shutouts; GAA = Goals Against

Awards and records
 Dave Keon, Lady Byng Trophy

See also
 Fifty Mission Cap, a song about the Leafs 1951 and 1962 Cup wins.

References
 Maple Leafs on Hockey Database
 Maple Leafs on Database Hockey

Stanley Cup championship seasons
Toronto Maple Leafs seasons
Toronto Maple Leafs season, 1961-62
Tor